Elka de Levie (21 November 1905 – 29 December 1979) was an Amsterdam-born Dutch gymnast who won the gold medal as member of the Dutch gymnastics team at the 1928 Summer Olympics in Amsterdam. She was the only Jewish team member to survive the Holocaust; her teammates Anna Dresden-Polak, Jud Simons and Helena Nordheim and coach Gerrit Kleerekoper were gassed in Sobibor, while Estella Agsteribbe was gassed in Auschwitz. The entire team was elected to the International Jewish Sports Hall of Fame in 1997.

On 31 October 1929 she married Andries Abraham Boas, with whom she had two daughters, but the couple were divorced on 20 April 1943. She and both her daughters survived the Second World War by going into hiding. Elka de Levie died in anonymity in Amsterdam on 29 December 1979.

See also
List of select Jewish gymnasts

References

Further reading

External links
 Database Olympics profile
 Elka de Levie commemoration, Yad Vashem website

1905 births
1979 deaths
Dutch female artistic gymnasts
Dutch Jews
Jewish gymnasts
Jewish Dutch sportspeople
Gymnasts at the 1928 Summer Olympics
Olympic gymnasts of the Netherlands
Olympic gold medalists for the Netherlands
Gymnasts from Amsterdam
Dutch Holocaust survivors
Olympic medalists in gymnastics
International Jewish Sports Hall of Fame inductees
Medalists at the 1928 Summer Olympics